KBN could refer to:

 Kare language, ISO 639-3 language code
 Kilburn High Road railway station, London, England; National Rail station code
 Tunta Airport, Kabinda, Democratic Republic of the Congo, IATA airport code